Andy Hardy Meets Debutante  is a 1940 American romantic comedy film directed by George B. Seitz. The film stars Lewis Stone, Mickey Rooney, Cecilia Parker, Fay Holden and Judy Garland. It is the ninth of the Andy Hardy full-length film series.

Plot
Andy Hardy from Carvel becomes infatuated with a well-known young socialite, Daphne Fowler, from New York City. Even though he hasn’t met the woman in person, he drops her name to his friends and tells them that they are very well acquainted. He even lets his friends believe he is romantically involved with Miss Fowler.

Hardy’s senseless namedropping gets him into trouble when his father, the honorable judge James K. Hardy, decides to move to New York with the whole family, to work on a case involving an orphanage. The judge has to appear in court against a law firm that is disputing payments from a trust fund that supports the orphanage. Andy’s friends, who happen to be editors at a paper, want to print the story about the romantic couple, and Andy is forced to get to know the socialite to avoid embarrassment. He goes off on a pursuit to meet Daphne and become friends with her. In New York, Andy encounters an old female friend, Betsy Booth, who happens to have a crush on him. Soon Andy has to evade romantic propositions from Betsy, while he is trying to meet with the popular and seemingly unattainable Daphne. Against all odds, Andy hears on radio that Daphne is to attend a function at a restaurant. He manages to get into the restaurant where Daphne is present, but he gets into trouble when he can’t live up to his own story about being a wealthy man, not being able to pay his bill. Things look dark for Andy, but his father goes from despair to success when he wins the orphanage case. Andy is inspired by his father’s successful litigation, and in a moment of honesty, he tells his friend Betsy about his situation. It turns out Betsy is friends with Daphne, and she agrees to introduce Andy to her. Thus, Andy avoids all embarrassment when the article about him and Daphne is published. In the end, Andy finds the high society life too expensive, and realizes that Betsy is the one for him. They have their first kiss, and they promise to write to each other regularly.

Cast

Box office
According to MGM records the film earned USD$1,945,000 in the US and Canada and $678,000 elsewhere resulting in a profit of $1,409,000.

References

External links
 
 
 
 
  The Judy Garland Online Discography "Andy Hardy Series" page.

1940 films
1940 romantic comedy films
American romantic comedy films
American black-and-white films
Films directed by George B. Seitz
Films set in New York City
Metro-Goldwyn-Mayer films
1940s English-language films
1940s American films